Nick Mennell is an American actor known for his stage work as well as his roles in the horror/slasher remakes of Halloween, and Friday the 13th.

Life and career

Mennell graduated from Juilliard School in 2005.

In 2007, Mennell was cast as Bob Simms, in the remake of the 1978 John Carpenter classic Halloween. The film was directed by Rob Zombie, and starred Scout Taylor-Compton, Danielle Harris, Malcolm McDowell, and Tyler Mane as Michael Myers. The film opened on August 31, 2007, and debuted at number one at the box office.

In 2008, Mennell was cast as Mike in the 2009 version of Friday the 13th and was directed by Marcus Nispel. The film also starred Amanda Righetti, Jared Padalecki, Danielle Panabaker, and Derek Mears as Jason Voorhees. The film opened on February 13, 2009, and debuted at number one at the box office. He stars also in the 2009 shot Fantasy horror film The Black Waters of Echo's Pond, which is directed by Gabriel Bologna.

Filmography

References

External links

Living people
American male film actors
Juilliard School alumni
Place of birth missing (living people)
1976 births
Date of birth uncertain